The Fort Wayne Moraine is considered contemporary to the last stages of the Valparaiso Moraine. Centered on Fort Wayne, Indiana, the northern leg of the moraine is mostly overlaid by the younger Wabash Moraine angling northeastward through Williams County, Ohio. It only becomes identifiable in Lenawee County, Michigan south and northeast of Adrian before ending in the intermingling of moraines around Ann Arbor. The south and eastern leg of the moraine follows the northern bank of the St. Marys River into the State of Ohio.

Description
Beginning northeast of Upper Sandusky in Wyandot, looping along the southern county boundary, entering Hardin County along its northern border with Hancock County.  The moraine then runs, west of southwest to the moraine runs, southwest to Lima. From Lima it runs west and northwest along the right bank of the St. Mary's River to Ft. Wayne. Continuing northeast on the left bank of the St. Joseph River to Hudson, Michigan in Lenawee County. 
The wide outer slope of a mile (1.6 km) or more provides any local relief. The drift is a clay till and has boulders.

St. Mary's (south) Unit
The presence of the moraine is evident in the course of St. Mary's River. Its headwaters in Auglaize and Mercer counties, flow north toward the Maumee until it comes to the moraine ridge. Here it turns to the west. The ridge forms the watershed between the St. Mary's and the Auglaize River. In Allen County, Indiana the Wayne trace, or old Piqua road follows the crest. The inner slope is gentle, while the outer slope is steep. The ridge is composed chiefly of boulder clay with a border of sand and gravel around its northern end.

St. Joseph (north) Unit
North of Fort Wayne the moraine is simple in structure. It extends from Ft. Wayne along the left bank of the St. Joseph River into Michigan. Through Indiana it is four miles (6.4 km) wide and gets broader through Ohio and Michigan.

Outliers
These are closely related to the Fort Wayne moraine. Two moraines run parallel with the main crest of the Fort Wayne moraine in the vicinity of Lima, Ohio. The Bluffton moraine is west of Mount Cory to Bluffton and then turns southwest to within a mile (1.6 km) of Cairo and Elida. The Rawson moraine runs west from Rawson and curves to the southwest roughly parallel with the Bluffton moraine some 2 or 3 miles (3.2 or 4.8 km) north.
A third significant ridge runs across Allen, Van Wert and into Adams and Allen counties. West, the ridge is distinct Monroeville, Indiana. Through Indiana the ridge is a double crest. North of Glenmore the moraine turns northwest. This ridge is later than the Bluffton moraine, and may be a westward continuation of the Rawson moraine.

See also
Mississinawa Moraine
Union City Moraine
Salamonie Moraine
Wabash Moraine
Defiance Moraine
Maumee Torrent
List of glacial moraines

References

Moraines of Indiana
Geological history of the Great Lakes
Landforms of Lenawee County, Michigan
Landforms of Williams County, Ohio
Landforms of Allen County, Indiana
Landforms of Allen County, Ohio
Landforms of Hardin County, Ohio
Landforms of Michigan
Landforms of Ohio
Landforms of Defiance County, Ohio